The 75 mm FRC M27 was a Belgian anti-aircraft gun built after the First World War and used during the Second World War.

History
The origins of the FRC M27 lie in the German Krupp 8.8 cm SK L/45 naval gun of 1913.  In addition to its role aboard warships of the Imperial German Navy, it was also used as a shore based anti-aircraft gun and coastal artillery during the First World War.  The Belgians obtained a number of these guns either when the Germans retreated or as reparations following Germany's defeat during the First World War.

The barrels were lined down to 75 mm by the Fonderie Royale des Canons (FRC) in 1927.  The guns were given a muzzle brake and mounted on a shielded, high angle mount on either a  dual-axle flatbed road carriage or on a railroad flatcar.  Those weapons captured after the German occupation of Belgium in 1940 were taken into Wehrmacht service as the 7.5 cm Flak(b).

Notes

External links
 http://www.navweaps.com/Weapons/WNGER_88mm-45_skc13.php

Anti-aircraft guns of Belgium
World War II anti-aircraft guns
75 mm artillery